Interstate/Rose Quarter station is a light rail station on the MAX Yellow Line in Portland, Oregon. It is the first stop northbound on the Interstate MAX extension. About 200 yards away is the Rose Quarter Transit Center's MAX station, where transfers to the eastbound MAX Blue and Red lines and the southbound Green Line are possible. Several bus lines also serve the transit center, making stops in the area between the two MAX stations.

The station is located in the median of Interstate Avenue near the Veterans Memorial Coliseum. The station serves the Moda Center, the Memorial Coliseum, and Portland's Rose Quarter district. The station has two side platforms, decorated with the station's signature artwork: Three glass and steel stylized trees on each platform that are illuminated at night.

Bus line connections
This station is served by the following bus lines, at the adjacent Rose Quarter Transit Center:
4 - Fessenden
8 - Jackson Park/NE 15th Ave
35 - Macadam/Greeley
44 - Capitol Hwy/Mocks Crest
77 - Broadway/Halsey
85 - Swan Island
C-Tran 157-Lloyd District Express

External links
Station information (with southbound ID number) from TriMet
Station information (with northbound ID number) from TriMet
MAX Light Rail Stations – more general TriMet page

2004 establishments in Oregon
Lloyd District, Portland, Oregon
MAX Light Rail stations
MAX Yellow Line
North Portland, Oregon
Railway stations in Portland, Oregon
Railway stations in the United States opened in 2004